The 1981 SWAC men's basketball tournament was held March 5–7, 1981. The quarterfinal round was held at the home arena of the higher-seeded team, while the semifinal and championship rounds were held at the F. G. Clark Center in Baton Rouge, Louisiana.  defeated , 69–63 in the championship game. The Jaguars received the conference's automatic bid to the 1981 NCAA tournament as No. 11 seed in the Midwest Region.

Bracket and results

References

1980–81 Southwestern Athletic Conference men's basketball season
SWAC men's basketball tournament